

Champions

Major League Baseball
World Series: New York Yankees over Brooklyn Dodgers (4–2)
All-Star Game, July 14 at Crosley Field: National League, 5–1

Other champions
All-American Girls Professional Baseball League: Grand Rapids Chicks
College World Series: Michigan
Japan Series: Yomiuri Giants over Nankai Hawks (4–2)
Little League World Series: Southside, Birmingham, Alabama
Winter Leagues
1953 Caribbean Series: Cangrejeros de Santurce
Cuban League: Leones del Habana
Dominican Republic League: Águilas Cibaeñas
Mexican Pacific League: Venados de Mazatlán
Panamanian League: Chesterfield Smokers
Puerto Rican League: Cangrejeros de Santurce
Venezuelan League: Leones del Caracas

Awards and honors
Baseball Hall of Fame
Ed Barrow
Chief Bender
Tom Connolly
Dizzy Dean
Bill Klem
Al Simmons
Bobby Wallace
Harry Wright
MLB Most Valuable Player Award
 Al Rosen (unanimous), Cleveland Indians, 3B
 Roy Campanella, Brooklyn Dodgers, C
MLB Rookie of the Year Award
 Harvey Kuenn, Detroit Tigers, SS
 Jim Gilliam, Brooklyn Dodgers, 2B
The Sporting News Player of the Year Award
Al Rosen, Cleveland Indians
The Sporting News Pitcher of the Year Award
Bob Porterfield, Washington Senators
Warren Spahn, Milwaukee Braves
The Sporting News Manager of the Year Award
Casey Stengel, New York Yankees

Statistical leaders

Major league baseball final standings

American League final standings

National League final standings

Events

January
January 21 – The Baseball Hall of Fame inducted former St. Louis Cardinals pitcher Dizzy Dean and former Philadelphia Athletics slugger Al Simmons.

February
Sportsman's Park is renamed Busch Stadium.

March
March 13 – Boston Braves owner, Lou Perini, announced he was moving the team to Milwaukee, where the Braves had their top farm club, in time for the 1953 season.
March 28 – Jim Thorpe, famed American Indian athlete considered by many as the greatest athlete in recorded history, died in Lomita, California at the age of 64. A native of Prague, Oklahoma, Thorpe played six seasons of Major League Baseball between 1913 and 1919, mostly for the New York Giants, in addition to his Olympic gold medals in the 1912 pentathlon and decathlon competition, while playing and coaching for a long time in the National Football League.

April
April 13 – In Cincinnati over 30,000 see the Milwaukee Braves win their first game, 2–0, behind the pitching of Max Surkont
April 17 – New York Yankees Mickey Mantle hit the longest home run in Griffith Stadium history, a 565-feet shot off Washington Senators Chuck Stobbs. The Yankees win, 7–3.
April 29 – Joe Adcock of the Milwaukee Braves hits the first home run ever hit over the center field wall of the Polo Grounds. The shot, measured 475 feet, comes off Jim Hearn in the third inning of the Braves' 3–1 victory over the New York Giants.
April 30 – The Little-Bigger League changes its name to the Babe Ruth League.

May
May   6 – At Sportsman's Park, Bobo Holloman of the St. Louis Browns no-hits the Philadelphia Athletics, 6–0, in his very first Major League start. Holloman will only post two more victories in his Major League career, in which his final appearance was on July 19 of this season.

June
June 3 – Congress cites the research of New York City librarian Robert Henderson in proving that Alexander Cartwright "founded" baseball and not Abner Doubleday. His 1947 book Bat, Ball and Bishop documents Cartwright's contributions to the origins of the game of the baseball.
June 14 – The New York Yankees sweep the Cleveland Indians, 6–2 and 3–0, before 74,708 at Cleveland Stadium to extend their winning streak at 18 games.
June 18 – In a 23–3 thrashing of the Detroit Tigers at Fenway Park, the Boston Red Sox set a still-standing Major League record by scoring 17 runs in one inning. After scoring twice in the sixth to break a 3–3 tie, the Red Sox go on their record-breaking run-scoring output in the seventh. Eleven Boston players score in the inning, with Sammy White scoring three times and Gene Stephens (who also collects three hits in the inning, becoming the first Major Leaguer in modern history to do so), Tom Umphlett, Dick Gernert and winning pitcher Ellis Kinder scoring twice.
June 25 – Ted Kazanski collects three hits and four runs batted in in his MLB debut to lead the Philadelphia Phillies to a 13–2 victory over the Chicago Cubs at Wrigley Field. As a result, Kazanski becomes the first player in Major League history to drive in at least four runs as a shortstop in his major league debut, according to the Elias Sports Bureau.

July
July 14 – The National League wins its fourth consecutive All–Star Game, 5–1, at Cincinnati's Crosley Field behind the stellar pitching of Robin Roberts and Warren Spahn. National League outfielder Enos Slaughter gets two hits, scores twice and robs Harvey Kuenn of an extra-base hit.

August
August 5 - Don Larsen of the St. Louis Browns pitches a complete game, a 5-0 loss to the Boston Red Sox. However, he goes 3 for 3 at the plate, in the process establishing a consecutive hits record for pitchers with seven.  
August 30 – In game one of a doubleheader, Jim Pendleton hit three home runs, as the Milwaukee Braves beat the Pittsburgh Pirates at Forbes Field, 19–4, while tying a major league record for the most home runs in a single game with eight, held by the New York Yankees since 1939. Besides, Pendleton became only the second rookie in history to hit three home runs in one game, joining his teammate Eddie Mathews, who hit it just a year earlier. In the second of the twin bill, the Braves hit four more long balls and crushed again Pittsburgh, 11–5. Moreover, the 12 homers in a doubleheader shattered the previous mark of nine. This time, Mathews belted four dingers for the day, which gave him a National League-leading 43. Matthews would finish the season with 47 home runs, 30 of them on the road, setting also a major league record. Previously, only the New York Yankees had ever hit more home runs in consecutive games, or in a doubleheader. The Yankees hit eight home runs in a 23–2 victory in the first game of a doubleheader, and five homers in a 10–0 win in the second game, played on June 28, 1939 against the Philadelphia Athletics at Shibe Park.

September
September 2 – The St. Louis Cardinals overcome a three-run inside-the-park home run by shortstop Ted Kazanski to beat the Philadelphia Phillies‚ 10–7. The Cardinals hammer 10 hits off Phillies starter Robin Roberts to hand him his 12th loss.
September 12 – Carl Erskine defeats the Braves 5–2, as the Brooklyn Dodgers clinch the pennant earlier than any other team in history.
September 13 – Pitcher Bob Trice becomes the first black player in Philadelphia Athletics history.
September 14 – The New York Yankees clinch their 5th straight pennant with an 8–5 win over the Cleveland Indians. Second baseman Billy Martin has 4 RBIs.

October
October 5 – The New York Yankees defeat the Brooklyn Dodgers, 4–3, in Game 6 of the World Series, to win their record-setting fifth consecutive World Championship and sixteenth overall, four games to two. Billy Martin was the star of the Series with a record-setting 12 hits, including the game-winning single in the bottom of the 9th of Game 6 to clinch the title.
October 7 – Bill Veeck, facing dwindling attendance and revenue, is forced to sell the St. Louis Browns to a Baltimore-based group led by attorney Clarence Miles and brewer Jerry Hoffberger. The Browns would move to Baltimore and be known as the Baltimore Orioles starting in the  season.
October 28- After a dispute with Dodgers owner Walter O'Malley, Dodgers announcer Red Barber resigns from his position and takes a job doing radio broadcast for the rival New York Yankees. Barber was upset that he could not get a higher fee from Gillette, who sponsored the T.V. broadcast of the 1953 World Series, and that O'Malley refused to support him.

November
November 9 – Reaffirming its earlier position, the United States Supreme Court rules, 7–2, that baseball is a sport and not a business and therefore not subject to antitrust laws. The ruling is made in a case involving New York Yankees minor league player George Toolson, who refused to move from Triple-A to Double-A.
November 10 – The New York Giants end their tour of Japan. It is reported that each Giants player received just $331 of the $3,000 they were promised.
November 24 – The Brooklyn Dodgers sign Walter Alston to a one-year pact as their manager for 1954. Alston will manage the Brooklyn/Los Angeles Dodgers over the next 23 seasons, winning 2,040 games and four World Championships.

December
December 1 – The Boston Red Sox trade for slugger Jackie Jensen, sending P Mickey McDermott and OF Tom Umphlett to the Washington Senators. A fear of flying will end his career prematurely.
December 9 – The U.S. Supreme Court upholds Major League Baseball's antitrust exemption and the reserve clause in Toolson v. New York Yankees, Inc.

Movies
The Kid from Left Field
Big Leaguer

Births

January
January   1 – Lynn Jones
January   1 – Joe Pittman
January   5 – Jim Gantner
January   8 – Bruce Sutter
January   9 – Iván DeJesús
January   9 – Phil Mankowski
January 12 – Terry Whitfield
January 13 – Odell Jones
January 16 – Dennis DeBarr
January 17 – Mark Littell
January 24 – Tim Stoddard
January 25 – Junior Moore
January 26 – Tom Bruno
January 31 – Mike Rowland

February
February   4 – Rob Picciolo
February   7 – Dan Quisenberry
February 11 – Tom Veryzer
February 12 – Dave Revering
February 17 – Jamie Easterly
February 17 – Jim Umbarger
February 21 – Rick Lysander
February 22 – Gerry Davis
February 23 – Fred Kuhaulua
February 24 – Mike Sember
February 24 – Frank Riccelli
February 27 – Ron Hassey

March
March   1 – Jeff Holly
March   2 – Dave Tobik
March   2 – Larry Wolfe
March   6 – Gerry Hannahs
March   7 – Randy Stein
March   8 – Jim Rice
March   8 – Don Werner
March 14 – Tim Ireland
March 16 – Jay Franklin
March 16 – Rich Puig
March 18 – Randy Miller 
March 19 – Tim Corcoran 
March 22 – Dan Boitano
March 23 – Bo Díaz
March 27 – Gary Alexander
March 29 – Tom Hume
March 30 – Mike Miley
March 31 – Tom Hausman

April
April   1 – Larry Murray
April   2 – Héctor Cruz
April   5 – Kim Allen
April 14 – Mark Bomback
April 16 – Don Reynolds
April 16 – Bruce Taylor
April 21 – Joe Keener
April 26 – Arturo DeFreites

May
May   3 – Keith Smith
May   5 – Gary Christenson
May   6 – Larry Andersen
May   9 – Ron Jackson
May 12 – Taylor Duncan
May 15 – George Brett
May 16 – Rick Rhoden
May 28 – Rafael Landestoy
May 29 – Mike Dupree

June
June   1 – Rick Baldwin
June   3 – Ed Glynn
June   4 – Larry Demery
June   5 – Paul Siebert
June   6 – Dave Bergman
June   8 – Jack Kucek
June 10 – Francisco Barrios
June 10 – Rick Camp
June 14 – Luis Aponte
June 14 – Mark Lee
June 20 – Tony Chévez
June 21 – Charlie Moore
June 21 – Gene Pentz
June 22 – Roy Thomas
June 27 – Joe Zdeb

July
July   2 – Tony Armas
July   3 – Frank Tanana
July 11 – Sam Hinds
July 12 – Roy Branch
July 13 – Joe Cannon
July 14 – Billy Smith
July 16 – Sheldon Mallory
July 20 – Gary Woods
July 22 – Kevin Pasley
July 25 – Biff Pocoroba
July 28 – Jerry Maddox
July 28 – Mark Williams
July 31 – Hank Small

August
August 4 – Masataka Nashida
August 5 – Rick Bosetti
August 5 – John Hale
August 5 – Jesús de la Rosa
August 5 – Rick Mahler
August 8 – Alvis Woods
August 10 – Tom Brookens
August 11 – Rex Hudson
August 11 – Dennis Lewallyn
August 15 – Nino Espinosa
August 16 – Nick Leyva
August 20 – Dan Dumoulin
August 24 – Luis Sánchez
August 25 – Bob Lacey
August 29 – Marv Foley
August 31 – Juan Bernhardt
August 31 – Bill Nahorodny

September
September   1 – Rob Wilfong
September   2 – Danny Goodwin
September   3 – Mike Paxton
September   7 – La Rue Washington
September   9 – Steve Ratzer
September 11 – Mike Gordon
September 12 – Greg Keatley
September 15 – Oswaldo Olivares
September 16 – Chris Knapp
September 18 – Mark DeJohn
September 23 – Brian Asselstine
September 25 – Dick Davis
September 25 – Ed Putman
September 26 – Jim Gideon
September 29 – Warren Cromartie
September 29 – Gene Richards
September 29 – Carlos Tosca
September 30 – Dan Gonzales

October
October   1 – Pete Falcone
October   2 – Kevin Kobel
October   4 – Dave Schuler
October   6 – Victor Bernal
October   7 – Andy Replogle
October 14 – Kiko Garcia
October 16 – Rodney Scott
October 20 – Keith Hernandez
October 21 – Juan Eichelberger
October 22 – Rich Wortham
October 23 – Bo McLaughlin
October 27 – Barry Bonnell
October 27 – U L Washington
October 29 – Randy McGilberry

November
November   2 – Paul Hartzell
November   3 – Larry Herndon
November   3 – Bobby Thompson
November   4 – Roger Slagle
November   6 – John Candelaria
November   6 – Brock Pemberton
November 10 – Larry Christenson
November 10 – Larry Parrish
November 10 – Paul Thormodsgard
November 14 – Kim Andrew
November 18 – Gilberto Rondón
November 20 – Duane Theiss
November 22 – Rick Matula
November 29 – Sixto Lezcano

December
December 3 – Bob Pate
December 3 – Pat Putnam
December 4 – Charlie Beamon Jr.
December 6 – Gary Ward
December 9 – Hiromitsu Ochiai
December 18 – Roy Howell
December 20 – Paul Moskau
December 22 – Tom Underwood
December 23 – Jerry Manuel
December 25 – Rick Anderson
December 30 – Steve Davis
December 31 – José Báez

Deaths

January
January   1 – Doug McWeeny, 56, pitcher who played for the Chicago White Sox, Brooklyn Robins and Cincinnati Reds over seven seasons between 1921 and 1930.
January   2 – Harry Atkinson, 78, left fielder for the 1895 St. Louis Browns.
January   3 – Joe Houser, 61, pitcher who played for the Buffalo Buffeds of the outlaw Federal League in 1914.
January   3 – Chuck Workman, 37, right fielder and third baseman who played for the Cleveland Indians, Boston Braves and Pittsburgh Pirates in parts of four seasons spanning 1938–1946.
January   5 – Mike Cantwell, 58, pitcher who played with the New York Yankees in 1916 and for the Philadelphia Phillies from 1919 to 1920.
January   5 – Pete Lapan, 61, backup catcher for the Washington Senators in 1922 and 1923.
January   9 – Pat Carney, 76, pitcher who played from 1901 through 1904 for the Boston Beaneaters of the National League.
January 11 – Doc Moskiman, 73, first baseman and right fielder for the Boston Red Sox in its 1910 season, who also spent parts of 13 seasons playing minor-league and independent-league ball, pitching more often than not and obtaining considerably good results.
January 14 – Charlie Small, 47, center fielder who played in 25 games for the Boston Red Sox during their 1930 season.
January 15 – Carl East, 58, outfielder and pitcher who played with the St. Louis Browns in 1915 and for the Washington Senators in 1924.
January 21 – Lorenza Cobb, 64, Negro league baseball catcher who played for the Indianapolis ABCs, West Baden Sprudels, St. Louis Giants and Lincoln Giants over seven seasons spanning 1914–1920.
January 21 – José Rodríguez, 58, Cuban Baseball Hall of Fame infielder whose 18-year career in professional baseball included a stint with the New York Giants of the National League from 1917 to 1918.   
January 24 – Ben Taylor, 64, National Baseball Hall of Fame player, manager, coach and umpire, who played for 24 different teams in Negro League Baseball between 1908 and 1941, being considered the best first baseman in black baseball prior to the arrival of Buck Leonard and one of the most productive players offensively, while collecting a .334 lifetime batting average and hitting over .300 in fifteen of his first sixteen years in baseball. 
January 27 – Merv Shea, 52, catcher who played in 439 games for seven teams in a span of 11 seasons from 1927–1944; also coached for the Detroit Tigers, Philadelphia Phillies and Chicago Cubs during the 1940s.
January 28 – Howie Haworth, 59, catcher who made seven game appearances for the Cleveland Indians in its 1915 season.
January 31 – Mike Handiboe, 65, backup outfielder for the 1911 New York Highlanders.

February
February 13 – Happy Foreman, 53, relief pitcher who played with the Chicago White Sox in 1924 and for the Boston Red Sox in 1926. 
February   2 – Mike Dejan, 38, outfielder for the Cincinnati Reds in its 1940 season.
February   3 – Frank Donnelly, 83, pitcher who played for the Chicago Colts in part of two seasons from 1893–1894.
February   6 – Ed Haigh, 86, backup outfielder for the St. Louis Browns of the National League in 1892.
February   6 – Tex Pruiett, 69, pitcher who played from 1907 through 1908 for the Boston Americans and Red Sox. 
February 21 – Buck Freeman, 56. pitcher who played for the Chicago Cubs in the 1921 and 1922 seasons.  
February 24 – Lenny Metz, 53, shortstop who played for the Philadelphia Phillies in a span of three seasons from 1923–1925. 
February 27 – Barney Wolfe, 77, pitcher who played four seasons from 1903–1906 for the New York Highlanders and the Washington Senators.

March
March   3 – Clyde Milan, 65, speedy outfielder and solid line drive hitter who batted .285 for the Washington Senators over the course of 16 seasons from 1907–1922, collecting 2,100 hits, 1,004 runs and 495 stolen bases, and leading the American League by stealing 88 bases in 1912 and 75 in 1913, while setting a modern-rules MLB season record for steals in 1912, a mark surpassed three years later by Ty Cobb; player-manager of 1922 Senators and member of Washington coaching staff for 17 seasons (1928–1929 and 1938 until his death). 
March   6 – Tex Pruiett, 69, pitcher who played from 1907 through 1908 for the Boston Americans and Red Sox.
March   7 – Tom Wilson, 62, backup catcher who played for the Washington Senators in its 1914 season.
March 11 – Jock Menefee, 85, pitcher for the Pittsburgh Pirates, Louisville Colonels, New York Giants, Chicago Orphans and Chicago Cubs in a span of nine seasons from 1892–1903, who gained notoriety with the Cubs on July 15, 1902, when he became the first pitcher in National League history to pull off a successful steal of home, a feat which he accomplished against the Brooklyn Superbas on July 15, 1902, and later on August 8, 1903 for start and win both games of a doubleheader against Brooklyn, as he finished his career starting both games of a doubleheader for the third time of the season, against Pittsburgh on September 7, but did not get a decision in either contest. 
March 11 – Fred Toney, 64, trustworthy pitcher whose 11-season major league career included stints with the Chicago Cubs, Cincinnati Reds, New York Giants and St. Louis Cardinals between 1911 and 1923, being a member of the Giants that won World Series titles in 1921 and 1922, while pitching a 10-inning no-hitter with Cincinnati against the Cubs on May 2, 1917, and ending his career with a 139–102 record and 2.69 earned run average in 336 appearances, including 158 complete games and 28 shutouts in 2,206 innings of work.  
March 16 – Oscar Jones, 76, pitcher who played from 1903 through 1905 for the Brooklyn Superbas.
March 20 – John Brackenridge, 72, pitcher who played for the Philadelphia Phillies in its 1904 season.
March 21 – Harry Truby, 82, 19th century second baseman who played from 1895 to 1896 with the Chicago Colts and Pittsburgh Pirates.
March 22 – Michael Driscoll, 60, pitcher for the 1916 Philadelphia Athletics.
March 25 – Tim Griesenbeck, 55, backup catcher for the 1920 St. Louis Cardinals.
March 28 – Jim Thorpe, 65, Native American and one of the greatest all-around athlete in the first half of the 20th century, who in addition to playing in MLB for six seasons between 1913 and 1919, won gold medals in the 1912 Summer Olympics in pentathlon and decathlon, played in the NFL for eight seasons between 1920 and 1928, barnstormed as a basketball player with a team composed entirely of American Indians, playing professional sports before retiring in 1928 at age 41, and later appeared in several films as an actor  while being portrayed by Burt Lancaster in the 1951 biopic Jim Thorpe – All-American.
March 30 – Alva Bradley, 69, principal owner of the Cleveland Indians from 1927 until he sold the franchise to Bill Veeck in 1946.

April
April   3 – Larry Benton, 55, pitcher who played for the Boston Braves, New York Giants and Cincinnati Reds over parts of thirteen seasons from 1923–1935, leading the National League with 25 wins and 28 complete games in 1928, and twice in W-L record from 1927 to 1928.
April   5 – Tex Erwin, 67, catcher who played with the Detroit Tigers in 1907, and for the Cincinnati Reds and the Brooklyn Superbas, Robins and Dodgers clubs in a span of five seasons from 1910–1914.  
April   5 – Connie Walsh, 70, pitcher who appeared in one game for the Pittsburgh Pirates in its 1907 season.
April   5 – Herb Gorman, 28, first baseman who made a pinch-hit appearance for the 1952 St. Louis Cardinals; suffered a fatal heart attack while playing in a Pacific Coast League game.
April 11 – Kid Nichols, Hall of Fame pitcher who posted 361 victories for the seventh most wins in Major League Baseball history, died in Kansas City, Missouri at the age of 79. Born in Madison, Wisconsin, Nichols anchored the pitching staff of the Boston Beaneaters between 1890 and 1901, guiding Boston to five National League championships in his first nine seasons with the club. He surpassed the 30-victory plateau seven times from 1891–1894 and 1896–1898, as his career record shows that he hurled 20 or more wins in ten consecutive seasons from 1891–1994 and in 1904. In addition, he remains as the youngest pitcher to reach the illustrious 300-win milestone, getting there months before his 31st birthday. His most productive season came in 1892, when he had a 35–16 record and won two games in the league's Championship Series as the Beaneaters defeated Cy Young and the Cleveland Spiders. Nichols remained with Boston through 1901, when the team let him go in an effort to save money. After a two-year lapse, he returned to the majors as manager and pitcher for the St. Louis Cardinals from 1904 to 1905 and ended his career with the Philadelphia Phillies in 1905. Overall, Nichols posted a 2.96 ERA, led the National league in wins for three straight years from 1896 to 1898, pitched more than 300 innings in every season but three and more than 400 five times while pitching 532 complete games and 48 shutouts in 562 starts, and was never removed from a game for a relief hurler.  Besides, his record of seven seasons with 30 or more victories is a mark that is likely to stand forever, since the implementation of five-man rotations, pitch count and inning limits in modern baseball.
April 14 – Roy Patterson, 77, Chicago White Sox pitcher best remembered for throwing the first pitch and recording the first win in the first official American League game on April 24, 1901, defeating the Cleveland Blues at Chicago's South Side Park, 8–2, while collecting an 81-72 career record and 2.75 ERA for Chicago in seven seasons from 1901–1907, including AL pennants in 1901 and 1906, though he did not pitch for the 1906 World Series champion White Sox team.
April 16 – Sam Gray, 55, pitcher in 379 games for the Philadelphia Athletics and St. Louis Browns over ten seasons from 1924 to 1933; won 20 games for 1928 Browns, then lost 24 for them three years later; led American League in shutouts in 1929. 
April 18 – Harry Niles, 72, outfielder and second baseman who played from 1906 through 1910 for the St. Louis Browns, New York Highlanders, Boston Red Sox and Cleveland Naps.
April 18 – Cotton Tierney, 59, second baseman and third baseman who played from 1920 to 1925 for the Pittsburgh Pirates, Philadelphia Phillies, Boston Braves and Brooklyn Dodgers, being honored by his great-great-nephew Jeff Euston, who created in 2005 a website named Cot's Baseball Contracts, which track all salaries of MLB players, contracts, bonuses, service time and franchise values.
April 26 – Don Brennan, 49, pitcher who played for the New York Yankees, Cincinnati Reds and New York Giants in a span of five seasons from 1933–1937.
April 29 – Gene McAuliffe, 81, backup catcher for the 1904 Boston Beaneaters

May
 May   2 – Fred Miller, 66, pitcher who made six appearances for the 1910 Brooklyn Superbas.
 May   3 – Kewpie Pennington, 56, pitcher for the 1917 St. Louis Browns.
 May   3 – Pete Scott, 55, backup outfielder who played from 1926 through 1928 for the Chicago Cubs and Pittsburgh Pirates.
 May   6 – Jim Jones, 76, outfielder who played for the Louisville Colonels and New York Giants in part of three seasons spanning 1897–1901.
 May 11 – Ed Hug, 68, backup catcher who played for the Brooklyn Superbas in its 1903 season.
 May 12 – Ed Summers, 68, pitcher for the Detroit Tigers over five seasons from 1908 to 1912, who posted a 24–12 record and 1.64 ERA in 301 innings of work in his rookie season, including two complete game victories over the Philadelphia Athletics in a doubleheader, finishing with a two-hit, 1–0 shutout in ten innings in the second game, becoming the only pitcher in major league history to throw two complete game victories and more than eighteen innings in both games of a doubleheader, a record that remain intact.
 May 13 – Jim Field, 90, 19th-century first baseman who played most of his career with five American Association clubs during four seasons between 1883 and 1890, but also played in the National League for the 1898 Washington Senators.
 May 16 – Jim Wallace, 71, backup outfielder for the 1905 Pittsburgh Pirates.
 May 19 – Sam Leever, 81, pitcher who spent his 13-year career with the Pittsburgh Pirates from 1898 to 1910, compiling a 194–100 record for a .660 W–L percentage, the ninth highest in MLB baseball history, leading the National League with a 2.06 ERA and seven shutouts in 1903 and in W-L% three times, while amassing 20 or more wins in four seasons.
 May 25 – Ray Grimes, 69, first baseman for the Boston Red Sox, Chicago Cubs and Philadelphia Phillies in a span of six seasons from 1921–1926, who posted a .329/.413/.480 line in 433 games and established a Major League season record with at least one run batted in over 17 consecutive games in 1922, a mark which still stands.
 May 27 – Jesse Burkett, Hall of Fame left fielder and three-time batting champion, died in Worcester, Massachusetts, at the age of 84. Born on December 4, 1868, in Wheeling, West Virginia, Burkett made his professional baseball debut in 1888 as a pitcher, winning 27 games for a minor league team in Pennsylvania. The next year, he posted a 39–6 record for a team in his native Worcester before surfacing in the National League in 1890 with the New York Giants, where he was turned into an outfielder. Afterwards, he joined the Cleveland Spiders from 1891–1898. In 1899, Burkette was assigned to the St. Louis Perfectos/Cardinals. He won three National League batting titles from 1895 to 1901, surpassing the .400 mark twice, hitting for the Spiders .405 and .410 in 1895 and 1896, respectively. In 1901, Burkett captured his third batting title with a .376 mark for the Cardinals, before finishing his 16-year career in the American League. Burkett jumped to the St. Louis Browns in 1902, playing for them three years before ending his career with the 1905 Boston Americans, who later became the Red Sox. Overall, Burkett compiled a lifetime batting average of .338 on the strength of 2,850 hits in 2,607 games, including a .415 on-base percentage, 320 doubles and 1,720 runs scored, while sharing with Rogers Hornsby and Ty Cobb the record of hitting .400 or better the most times. He also earned a 1916 World Series ring as a coach for his former Giants team.

June
June   7 – Bill Burns, 73, left handed pitcher for five Major League Baseball teams in five seasons from 1908 to 1912, who infamously returned to the majors as one of the conspirators in the famous Black Sox Scandal.
June 11 – Tex Vache, 64, fourth outfielder for the 1925 Boston Red Sox.
June 22 – Charlie Hemphill, 77, outfielder who played for six teams over 11 seasons from 1899–1911, being also the first Opening Day right fielder in Boston Americans/Red Sox franchise history in its 1901 season.

July
July   5 –  Frank McCue, 54, third baseman who made two games appearances for the 1922 Philadelphia Athletics.
July 11 – Lew Wendell, 61, catcher for the New York Giants and Philadelphia Phillies over five seasons spanning 1915–1926.
July 21 – Al Kellogg, 66, pitcher for the Philadelphia Athletics during their 1908 season.
July 25 – Pat Hilly, 66, right fielder for the Philadelphia Phillies in its 1914 season.  
July 30 – Leon Chagnon, 50, pitcher who played for the Pittsburgh Pirates and New York Giants in a span of six seasons between 1929 and 1935.

August
August   6 – Bill Phyle, 78, two-way player who pitched over twelve seasons from 1898 through 1999 with the Chicago Orphans and for the New York Giants in 1901, before performing as a third baseman for the St. Louis Cardinals in 1906, working later as an umpire in the Pacific Coast League.
August   7 – Abner Powell, 98, 19th century pitcher who played in the Union Association for the Washington Nationals in 1884, playing later in the American Association for the Baltimore Orioles and Cincinnati Red Stockings during the 1886 season.
August   9 – Joe Evans, 56, third baseman and outfielder whose career included stints with the Cleveland Indians, Washington Senators and St. Louis Browns in eleven seasons spanning 1911–1925, being also a member of the 1920 World Series Cleveland champion team.
August 16 – Ty Tyson, 61, outfielder who played from 1926 through 1928 for the New York Giants and Brooklyn Robins.
August 22 – Jim Tabor, 36, slugging third baseman for the Boston Red Sox and Philadelphia Phillies over nine seasons from 1938–1947; led the American League in assists in 1939 and putouts in 1942; collected four home runs, 11 runs batted in and 19 total bases in a 1939 doubleheader against the Philadelphia Athletics; three of his homers came in the second game, including a record-tying two grand slams in consecutive innings, while his 11 RBI is an American League record that remains intact as of 2019. 
August 25 – Charlie Maisel, 63, catcher who played in 1915 for the Baltimore Terrapins of the outlaw Federal League.
August 27 – Charlie Shields, 73, pitcher who played in 1902 with the Baltimore Orioles and St. Louis Browns and for the St. Louis Cardinals in 1907.

September
September   3 – Jack Pfiester, 75, pitcher for the Pittsburgh Pirates and Chicago Cubs over eight seasons between 1903 and 1911, who won two World Series with the Cubs in 1907–1908, led the National League with a 1.15 earned run average in 1907, winning 20 games in 1906 and posting a career record of 71-44, whose lifetime 2.02 ERA is the third best of all-time for MLB pitchers with at least 1,000 innings of work.
September   4 – Buck Herzog, 53, versatile infielder who played from 1908 through 1920 with four National League teams and also managed the Cincinnati Reds from 1914–1916, winning four NL pennants, while collecting 12 hits in the 1912 World Series to set a series record since then tied and broken. 
September 11 – Bob Coulson, 66, outfielder for the Cincinnati Reds, Brooklyn Superbas/Dodgers and Pittsburgh Rebels in part of three seasons spanning 1908–1914.
September 13 – Wese Callahan, 6s, shortstop for the 1913 St. Louis Cardinals.
September 15 – Seth Sigsby, 79, 19th century pitcher who played in 1893 for the New York Giants.
September 18 – Chub Aubrey, 72, shortstop who played for the Boston Beaneaters in its 1903 season.
September 26 – Bill Cunningham, 59, outfielder who played from 1921 through 1924 for the Boston Braves and New York Giants, whose two-run single in the decisive game of the 1922 World Series sparked the Giants to a 5–3 victory over the New York Yankees at the Polo Grounds en route to the championship title.
September 29 – Lefty Tyler, 63, pitcher who played with the Boston Doves/Rustlers/Braves clubs from 1910–1917 and for the Chicago Cubs from 1918–1921, being also a member of the famous Miracle Braves who swept the highly favored Philadelphia Athletics in the 1914 World Series.

October
October   5 – Rags Faircloth, 61, pitcher who made two appearances for the Philadelphia Phillies in 1919. 
October 17 – Jim Delahanty, 74, one of five Delahanty brothers to play in the majors, a fine defensive second baseman who had a 13-year career with eight teams spanning 1901–1915, while batting a solid .283/.357/.373/.730 line and 1,159 hits in 1,186 career games.

November
November   3 – John Chapman, 54, shortstop for the 1924 Philadelphia Athletics.
November   6 – Tom Dougherty, 72, pitcher who made one-game relief appearance for the Chicago White Sox in 1904, who is probably unique in Major League Baseball history for his perfect 1-0 winning record in a game where he faced the minimum six batters over two innings, without giving up a run, hit or walk in his immaculate work.
November 18 – Mike McCormick, 71, third baseman for the 1904 Brooklyn Superbas.
November 19 – Guy Lacy, 56, second baseman who played for the Cleveland Indians in its 1926 season.
November 19 – Dutch Schesler, 53, German pitcher who appeared in 17 games for the Philadelphia Phillies in 1931.
November 20 – Billy Maharg, 72, professional boxer that achieved three distinct historical connections with Major League Baseball, 1) as a replacement player in the 1912 Detroit Tigers' players strike, 2) for a one-game stint with the 1916 Philadelphia Phillies, and 3) because of his role in the 1919 Chicago Black Sox Scandal.

December
December   7 – Slats Jordan, 75, utility man for the 1951-52 Baltimore Orioles.
December 10 – Harry Armbruster, 71, backup outfielder for the Philadelphia Athletics in its 1906 season.
December 13 – Klondike Douglass, 81, 19th century first baseman and catcher who played in the National League for the St. Louis Browns and Philadelphia Phillies in a span of nine seasons from 1896–1904.
December 15 – Ed Barrow, 85, Hall of Fame executive and notable judge of talent, who discovered Honus Wagner 1896 and later converted Babe Ruth from pitcher to outfielder, also signing contracts with Lou Gehrig, Joe DiMaggio, Lefty Gomez, Tony Lazzeri and Red Ruffing; as business/general manager and club president, oversaw the New York Yankees' dynasty that captured 14 American League pennants and 10 World Series championships from 1921 to 1945, including five Series sweeps; earlier, served as field manager of 1903–1904 Detroit Tigers and 1918–1920 Boston Red Sox, leading 1918 Bosox to world championship
December 17 – Walt Devoy, 68, multi-sport athlete who played right field for the 1903 St. Louis Browns, playing also in the St. Louis Soccer League, where he later was  an executive for the Ben Millers
December 17 – Walt Devoy, 68, multi-sport athlete who played right field for the 1903 St. Louis Browns, playing also in the St. Louis Soccer League, where he later was  an executive for the Ben Millers FC.
December 17 – Lou McEvoy, 51, who made 34 pitching appearances for the New York Yankees from 1931-32.
December 24 – Pinch Thomas, 65, backup catcher whose nickname reflects his pinch-hitting abilities, as he posted a batting average of .419 (13-for-31) for the Boston Red Sox and Cleveland Indians from 1912 to 1921, while earning four World Series titles with Boston (1912; 1915–16) and Cleveland (1920).
December 25 – Patsy Donovan, 88, Irish-American right fielder and manager who played for several teams over 17 years spanning 1890–1907, while managing five teams in 11 seasons from 1897–1911, collecting a .301 batting career average of .301 with 2,253 hits and 518 stolen bases, and a managerial record of 684–879 (.438).

Sources

External links

 Baseball Reference – 1953 MLB season summary
Baseball Reference – MLB Players born in 1953
Baseball Reference – MLB Players died in 1953